Hybochelus fossulatus is a species of sea snail, a marine gastropod mollusk in the family Chilodontidae.

Description
The size of the shell varies between 6 mm and 15 mm.
The umbilicate, whitish shell is heliciform. It is spotted with pale reddish. The five convex whorls are separated by canaliculate sutures, all over regularly clathrate. The penultimate whorl has 4 spiral cinguli, a minute riblet interposed in each interval. The pits between the longitudinal and spiral riblets are oblong and quadrilateral. The body whorl is convex beneath, with close radiating lamellae . The ovate aperture is sulcate inside. The thin outer lip is plicate. The arcuate columella is edentulous and a little reflexed above. The white umbilical tract is striate. The umbilicus is profound.

Distribution
This marine species occurs off Japan and the Philippines

References

External links
 To Encyclopedia of Life
 To World Register of Marine Species
 

fossulatus